Paula Fitzpatrick (born 12 August 1985) is an Irish rugby union player. She was a member of the Irish squad to the 2014 Women's Rugby World Cup. She took on the blindside Flanker role in their historical defeat of the Black Ferns.

Fitzpatrick initially played as Hooker before transitioning into her current Loose Forward position.

References

1985 births
Living people
Irish female rugby union players
Ireland women's international rugby union players
St Mary's College RFC players
Leinster Rugby women's players
Rugby union flankers